Beautiful and Damned is a musical with a book by Kit Hesketh Harvey and music and lyrics by Les Reed and Roger Cook.

Drawing its title from F. Scott Fitzgerald's second novel, it focuses on the turbulent relationship he shared with his wife Zelda during the Jazz Age. Young, stylish, and successful, they are the envy of high society friends who are unaware that behind their glamorous façade are two individuals doomed to tragedy.

Productions
The musical premiered in Guildford at the Yvonne Arnaud Theatre in June 2003, with John Barrowman and Helen Anker.

The West End production opened on 28 April 2004 (previews) at the Lyric Theatre, where it ran until 14 August. Directed and choreographed by Craig Revel Horwood, the cast included Michael Praed (Scott), Helen Anker (Zelda), Jo Gibb, Susannah Fellows, and David Burt.

A new production, helmed by Baltimore-based designer Sammy Robert Jungwirth, will be produced under the new title, “Zelda” in Maryland in 2023 through special arrangement with the show’s global rights owner www.Lucky4music.com.

Song list
I'm Dancing
I'll Meet You at the Ball Tonight
Beautiful Magnolia
I Refuse to Be a Girl
Little Miz Alabama
Tomorrow Won't Happen 'til Tomorrow
Casey's Grill/Shooter's Shoes
The Letters
The Beautiful and the Damned
So Long New York to Europe
Living Well's the Only Way
The Old World Shines Again
Trouble
She's Over the Top - He's Under the Table
Golden Days
Princess of the Western World
Oh How Tender is the Night
Save Me the Waltz
Being a Woman
Even Now

References

https://www.broadwayworld.com/baltimore/article/Zelda-Fitzgerald-Musical-ZELDA-To-Be-Produced-In-Maryland-20220217

External links
Official website

2004 musicals
West End musicals
Musicals set in the Roaring Twenties
British musicals